Lion & Pelican is the tenth studio album recorded and produced by a Japanese singer-songwriter Yōsui Inoue, released in December 1982.

The album has been well known for a song "Riverside Hotel", which was originally released as a single before the album came out. It became a smash hit in later years, because the song was featured as a theme song for the drama Love Story in New York aired on Fuji TV in 1988.

Lion & Pelican also includes Inoue's own rendition of "Senaka Made 45-fun" and "Chinese Food", the songs that he previously wrote for Kenji Sawada's album Mis Cast released in 1982.
The album itself gained moderate commercial success, selling in excess of 150,000 copies although it couldn't reach the top-ten on the charts.

Track listing
All lyrics written and composed by Yosui Inoue
""
"Chinese Food"
""
""
""
""
""
""
""
""

Personnel
The following personnel was credited in the liner notes for box-set No Selection, released in 1991.

Yōsui Inoue - Lead vocals, chorus, guitar
Tōru Aoyama - Guitar
Kazuo Shiina - Guitar
Fujimal Yoshino - Guitar
Hiromi Yasuda - Guitar
Kenji Ōmura - Guitar
RA - Guitar
Ryōmei Shirai - Guitar
Makoto Matsushita - Guitar
Akira Wada - Guitar
Tsugutoshi Gotō - Bass
Akira Okazawa - Bass
Michio Nagaoka - Bass
Shigeru Okazawa - Bass
Kiyofumi Onoda - Bass
Yasuharu Nakanishi - Keyboards
Ryoichi Kuniyoshi - Keyboards
Tōru Okada - Keyboards
Yūji Kawashima - Synthesizer
Izumi Kobayashi - Synthesizer
Osamu Nakajima - Percussion
Motoya Hamaguchi - Percussion
Hideo Yamaki - Drums
Jun Aoyama - Drums
Eiji Shimamura - Drums
Kiyoshi Tanaka -  Drums

Production
Producer, performer, composer, lyricist: Yōsui Inoue
Arranger: Yūji Kawashima (M2/4/5/10), Katz Hoshi (M1/7), Tsugutoshi Gotō (M3/9), Ginji Itou (M6), Yasuharu Nakanishi (M8)
Director: Shohei Kaneko
Recording and Remix Engineer: Toshiyuki Iizumi, Tomiji Iyobe, Yūji Kawashima
Coordinator: Masahiko Ikeda
Art Director: Isao Sakai
Photographer: Katsuo Hanzawa
Stylist: Hideo Mori
Hair/Make: Kikumaru
Design: Takeharu Tanaka, Yumiko Ohta (Soap inc.)
Artist Management: Camp Co.,Ltd.

Chart positions

Album

Singles

Release history

References

1982 albums
Yōsui Inoue albums